This is a list of Kawasaki motorcycles designed and/or manufactured by Kawasaki Heavy Industries Motorcycle & Engine and its predecessors.

Special purpose
 Kawasaki police motorcycles

Cruiser
 Vulcan 2000
 Kawasaki Vulcan 1700 Classic/Classic LT/Nomad/Voyager
 Vulcan 1600 Nomad
 Vulcan 1600 Classic
 Vulcan 1600 Mean Streak
 Vulcan 1500 Drifter
 Vulcan 900 Classic
 Vulcan 800 Classic
 Vulcan 800 Drifter
 Eliminator
 Kawasaki Estrella
 Vulcan 700
 Vulcan 750
 Vulcan 400/500/750/800/900/1500/1600/1700/2000
 Vulcan 500 LTD
 Vulcan S 650
 Kawasaki 454 LTD
 Vulcan 400 Classic - similar to the VN1600 and the VN800.
 Vulcan 400 Drifter

Dual purpose
 Kawasaki F1TR
 Kawasaki F2TR
 G4/KV100
 G5
 GA5A
 KE100
 KE125
 KE175
 KL250C
 KLR250/KL250D
 KL250G/H Super Sherpa
 KLX250S
 KLX300R
 KLX400SR
 KLE400
 KLE500
 KLR600
 KLR650
 KLX650C
 KM100
 Kawasaki J1TR

Off road
 KV75
 KD100M
 KDX50
 KDX80
 KDX125
 KDX175
 KDX200
 KDX220
 KDX250
 KDX400
 KDX420
 KDX450
 KLX110
 KLX125
 KLX125L
 KLX140L
 KLX150
 KLX230
 KLX250
 KLX400R
 KLX450R
 KLX650R
 KMX 125/200
 KT250
 KX60
 KX65
 KX80
 KX85
 KX100
 KX125
 KX250
 KX250F
 KX450F
 KX420
 KX500

Streetbikes
A1 Samurai 250 (1967–1971)
A7 Avenger 350 (1967–1971)
Agila HD 125 (1974-1989)
B1-125cc (1966-2001)
B85 & B85M 125 (1965)
D1 100 (1966–1969)
 Eliminator 125
 ER-5
 Fury 125
 GTO 125 (1983-1993)
 HD-1 100cc (1974-1980)
HD-II (1980-2000)
HD-X (1983-2003)
HD-III 125cc 2-stroke (1982-2007)
H1 Mach III 500 (1969–1975)
H2 Mach IV 750 (1971–1975)
KB100 RTZ (1986-1996)
KH500 (1976 only)
KH400
KH125 (1975-1998)
Kawasaki KSR110
S1 Mach I 250 (1971–1975)
S2 Mach II 350 (1971–1975)
 Versys
 Z125 Pro
 Z250SL
 Z250
 Z750
 Z800
 Z1000
 ZRX1200R
 ZZR250
 ZZR400
 ZZR600
 ZZR1100
 ZZR1200
 ZZR1400, also marketed as the ZX-14

Sport bikes
 Kawasaki KRR 150 ( VICTOR, SE, SSR, SERPICO) (Production year: 1998–2004) 2 Stroke Engine ( Marketed in the Philippines )
 Ninja-RR (A.K.A. KR150, NINJA-R, NINJA-SS) (Production year: 2012–2015) 2 Stroke Engine ( Only Marketed for Malaysia , Thailand, Japan and Indonesia
 Ninja 250R (A.K.A. EX250, GPZ 250, ZZ-R250) (Production year: 1986–present)
 Ninja 300 (A.K.A. EX300) (Production year: 2012–present)
 Ninja 400R (A.K.A. EX400, (Production year: 2011–present)
 Ninja 500R (A.K.A. EX500, GPZ500S, ZZ-R500) (Production year: 1987–2009)
 Ninja 650R (A.K.A. ER-6F EX650R) (Production year: 2006–present)
 Ninja ZX-150RR (A.K.A. KR150, KR150K, KRR150, Ninja 150 RR, Ninja RR) (Production year: 1996–present)
 Ninja ZX-6R and 6RR (Production year: 1995–present)
 Ninja ZX-750F (Production year: 1987-1990)
 Ninja 1000 (A.K.A. 2011-2019 Z1000Sx, 2020- Ninja 1000SX) (Production year: 2011–present)
 Ninja ZX-10R (Production year: 2004–present)
 Ninja ZX-12R

Sport-Touring
 ZG-1000 Concours / GTR1000
 Concours 14 / 1400GTR
 Voyager 1700 (reintroduced in 2009)

Scooters
J300
J300 Special Edition
Epsilon 250
J125

Models no longer in production
 A1 Samurai 250cc
 A7 Avenger 350cc
 Kawasaki AE50 50CC  (produced 1981–1986)
 Kawasaki AE80 80cc (produced 1981–1986)
 Kawasaki AR50 50cc (produced 1981–1994)
 Kawasaki AR80 80cc (produced 1981–1994)
 Kawasaki AR80K Liquid Cooled (produced 1992-1998)
 B7 Pet (Step-Thru)
 B8 125cc (1962–1965)
 Kawasaki B8M Red-Tank Furore 125cc 1962–1965)
C2SS & C2TR (1964–1968)
 G1M 100cc (1967)
 G31M Centurion (1970–1971)
 HD-III (Sold only in the philippines) (Produced: 1982-2007)
 Kawasaki G4TR G4 'Trail Boss' produced in early 1970 (1971 (G4TR-A), 1972 (B), 1973 (C), 1974 (D), 1974 G4TR-A 'Agi'Bike, 1975 (E), 1975 G4TRAA 'Agi'Bike). 10 speed - 5 high 5 low 997cc
 Kawasaki KV100 KV100 A7-A9 (1976–78) KV100 B2-B4 (1976–78) mainly sold as farm ('agi') bike in Australia, New Zealand & Canada 
 F11M 250cc (1967) (1973-1975AB)
 F21M "Green Streak" (1968–1971)
 F3 Bushwhacker 175cc (1968–1970)
 F4 Sidewinder 250cc (1969–1970)
 F5 Bighorn 350cc (1970–1971)
 F6 Enduro 125cc (1971–1974)
 F7 Enduro 175cc (1971–1975)
 F8 Bison 250cc (1971–1972)
 F81M "Green Streak" 250cc (1971)
 F9 Bighorn 350cc (1971–1975)
 ER500A/D 498cc (1996–2008)
 Ninja ZXR 250 / ZX-2R (produced: 1988–1999)
 Ninja ZXR 400 (produced: 1991–2003)
 Ninja ZXR 750 / ZX-7 (L model [zx7] street; M model [zx7r] race 93-95) (produced: 1984–1995)
 Ninja ZX-7R / ZX-7RR (J model [ZX7] street; K model [ZX7R] race 91-92)(produced: 1996–2003)
 Ninja ZX-9R (produced: 1994–2003)
 Ninja 1000R  (produced: 1986–1987)
 Ninja ZX-10 / ZZR-1000  (produced: 1988–1990)
 Ninja ZX-11 / ZZR 1100 (produced: 1990–2001)
 ZZR1200 / ZZ-R1200 (produced: 2002 - 2005)
 GPz750 (produced: 1983–1987)
 GPZ1100B1/B2 (produced: 1981–1982)
 GPZ1100E (produced: 1995–1996)
 GPZ250R (Released in Japan only) (produced:1985-?)
 GPZ305 (produced 1983–1994)
 GPz750 Turbo (produced: 1983–1985)
 Ninja GPZ900R (produced: 1984–2003)
 Ninja 600R AKA: GPz600R, GPX600R, ZX600A-C (produced: 1985–1997)
 ZX600A Website with Specs.
 454 LTD (produced: 1985–1990)
 Kawasaki S1 Mach I 250cc  (produced: 1972) (a two-stroke triple)
 Kawasaki S2 Mach II 350cc (produced: 1972) (a two-stroke triple)
 S3 400  (a two-stroke triple)
 Kawasaki H1 Mach III 500cc (produced: 1968–1972) (a two-stroke triple)
 Kawasaki H2 Mach IV 750cc (a two-stroke triple)
 KR250
 KH125 (produced 1975–1998)
 AR125
 Kaze ZX130 (Produced: 2006-2009)
 ZG1200 Voyager XII (Four)
 ZN1300 Voyager XIII (Six)
 KE100 (produced 1976–2001)
 KE125
 KL250A1/A2/A3/A4 (produced: 1978–1981)
 KR-1/KR-1S/KR-1R (produced: 1989-1993 KR-1R)
 KH250/400/500 (See article)
 Z500/Z550 (A.K.A. KZ500, KZ550, GPz550) (produced: 1979–1985)
 Kawasaki Z750 twin (produced: 1976–1978)
 Z1/KZ900 (produced: 1972–1976; Z900 sold in North America as KZ900)
 Z1R (factory production cafe racer 1015cc four-cylinder; produced 1978–1980)
 Z750RS Z2 (produced: 1973–1978)
 KZ750L3 (produced: 1983)
 KZ750L4 (produced: 1984)
 KZ750N - Spectre (produced 1982-1984)
 KZ200 (produced: 1980–1984)
 KZ305CSR
 KZ400/Z400 (produced: 1974–1984)
 KZ440/Z440
 KZ350
 Z650 (produced: 1976–1983; sold in North America as KZ650)
 Z1000-H (Fuel Injected, Produced 1980)
 Z1000-ST (Shaft drive, Produced 1979-1981)
 KZ1300 (Six cylinder)
 ZL900A Eliminator (produced 1985–1986)
 ZL600A Eliminator (produced 1986(a) only 1987(b) ..1995(c)-1996(c) in North America.. this bike was available in Europe until 1999-2000)
 ZN700LTD (produced 1984–1985)
 ZR-7 (produced: 1999–2003)
 ZEPHYR 750 (produced: 1991–1999)
 ZR-1100
 KSR II
 W650 (produced: 1999- 2007)
 Voyager
 ZZR1100 (produced: 1990–2002)
 KZ-1000 (various configurations; produced 1977–1980)
 KZ-1100 (various configurations; produced 1981–1983)
 AE 50 (produced: circa 1981–1982)
 KZ900 A4 (produced: ca 1976)
 Kawasaki F1TR 175cc (1966)
 Kawasaki F2TR 175cc (1967)
 Kawasaki J1TR 85cc (1967)

ATV / Quad
 Aeon Cobra
 Bayou 185
 Bayou 220
 Bayou 250
 Bayou 300
 Bayou 400
 Brute Force 300
 Brute Force 650
 Brute Force 750
 KFX 50 (re-badged Suzuki LT-A50 until 2006, now an independent design)
 KFX 80 (re-badged Suzuki LT80)
 KFX 90
 KFX 400 (re-badged Suzuki LT-Z400)
 KFX 450R
 KFX 700 V-Force
 KLT 110
 KLT 160
 KLT 185
 KLT 200
 Duckster 200
 KLT 250
 Lakota 300
 Lakota Sport 300
 Mojave 110
 Mojave 250
 Prairie 250 (based on the KLT 250)
 Prairie 300
 Prairie 360
 Prairie 400 (first adult-sized ATV with a fully automatic transmission)
 Prairie 650 (first production ATV with a V-twin engine)
 Prairie 700
 Tecate-3 250
 Tecate-4 250

Road racing motorcycles
Kawasaki KZ1000S1
 Ninja ZX-RR
 KR250
 KR350
 KR500
 KR750
 KR1000
 KR-2
 KR-3
 A1R
 A7R
 H1-R
 H1-RW
 H2-R
 X-09
 F5-R
 602S

References

External links

 
Kawasaki